Hufaidh (Arabic: حفيظ): is a mythical island in the marshes of southern Iraq, believed to exist by the Ma'dan or Marsh Arabs.

The Ma'dan informants of the traveller Wilfred Thesiger asserted that:

R. S. M. Sturges (Political Officer at Qurnah in 1920) shared with Thesiger a possible connection between Hufaidh and the biblical Garden of Eden.  Sturges wrote about the local legend of “a lost island in the marshes bearing luscious fruits and guarded . . . On certain nights it shone with a radiance visible for many miles. It seemed to move like some out-size will-o'-the-wisp and eluded all attempts to track it down . . . I saw it myself once – a strong diffused glow as of the full moon just below the horizon.”

Thesiger's host, Sadam, earlier related that “One of the Fartus saw it, years ago, when I was a child. He was looking for buffalo and when he came back his speech was all muddled up, and we knew he had seen Hufaidh."

He further said, “Saihut, the great AIbu Muhammad sheikh, searched for Hufaidh with a fleet of canoes in the days of the Turks, but he found nothing.

When Thesiger made some skeptical comment Sadam emphatically said, "No, Sahib, Hufaidh is there all right. Ask anyone, the sheikhs or the Government. Everyone knows about Hufaidh."

The island is, perhaps, analogous to the Irish mythical island of Hy-Brazil.

References

External links
 Biography of Wilfred Thesiger, including quotes from The Marsh Arabs

Mythological islands
Locations in Mesopotamian mythology
Iraqi folklore
Islands of Iraq
Jinn-related places
Marsh Arabs